Toney Bernard Douglas (born March 16, 1986) is an American professional basketball player for Benfica of the Liga Portuguesa de Basquetebol. He played college basketball for Auburn for one year, eventually becoming frustrated with his role on the team as a shooting guard. He subsequently transferred to Florida State University for the remainder of his collegiate career, where he switched to the point guard position. Emerging as a defensive force in his junior season, Douglas set school and conference records for steals. He stepped up as a team leader in his final season, breaking personal records in several statistical categories and helped lead the Seminoles to their first NCAA Tournament in 11 years.

Douglas was drafted by the Los Angeles Lakers in the 2009 NBA draft with the 29th overall pick, but was immediately traded to the New York Knicks. He played for the Knicks, Houston Rockets, Sacramento Kings and the Golden State Warriors before being traded to the Miami Heat in 2014. After spending the 2014–15 season in China with the Jiangsu Dragons, he returned to the NBA in 2015, joining the New Orleans Pelicans.

Early life and high school
Douglas was born to Harry and Stephanie Douglas in Tampa, Florida, but moved to Jonesboro, Georgia with his parents as a youth. He attended Jonesboro High School, where he was starter for its basketball team for three years. Douglas played alongside his brother, Harry, for the same amount of time. He spent most of his freshman season (2000–01) on the junior varsity team. In the 2001–02 season, when he was made a starter, Douglas averaged 21.5 points, 6.5 rebounds and 4.0 assists per game, and became the first sophomore to earn first-team honors at the all-region and all-state levels. In his junior season, Douglas averaged 28.5 points, 7.5 rebounds and 4.0 assists per game, scoring 20 points or more 24 times. He was named the Georgia Class 5A Player of the Year, and helped lead the team to the championship game of the state playoffs. Douglas averaged 34 points per game as a senior, and the team advanced as far as the state semifinals. He departed Jonesboro High as Clayton County's leading scorer, with 2,404 points. He was subsequently named fourth-team Parade All-American and earned a McDonald's All-American nomination. Considered a four-star recruit by Rivals.com, Douglas was listed as the No. 14 shooting guard and the No. 66 player in the nation in 2004.

College career

Auburn
Douglas committed to Auburn University during his junior year of high school. Playing as the starting shooting guard in his freshman season (2004–05), he led the team in scoring, at 16.9 points per game, and scored a team season-high (as well as career high) 38 points against Nicholls State. Douglas, who had the second-highest freshman scoring average in the nation, was voted to the All-SEC Freshman Team, third-team Freshman All-America, and third-team All-SEC—Douglas was the fourth Auburn freshman to be named to the latter.

Transfer
Douglas submitted his name for the NBA draft in the 2005 offseason, but did not sign with an agent, therefore allowing him to stay eligible for college when he later withdrew from the process. Despite Douglas' success at Auburn, he and his family were unhappy with his position on the basketball team. Douglas wanted to be the team's point guard, which he believed was his more natural position and the one he would play in the NBA. However, team management did not accede to his request, prompting him to request a transfer. Then-coach Jeff Lebo granted Douglas his scholarship release on the condition that he transfer to a non-SEC university. On June 29, 2005, Douglas enrolled at Florida State University, where coach Leonard Hamilton allowed him to play point guard. Because National Collegiate Athletic Association (NCAA) rules stipulate that players who transfer must sit out the following season, Douglas only began playing with the team in the 2006–07 season, although he still practiced with them during 2005–06.

Florida State

Sophomore year
Douglas initially struggled at the point guard position while adjusting to the Florida State offense, but continued to play well in other respects. The early part of his sophomore season was highlighted by his shot block that helped to seal an upset victory against then-fourth-ranked University of Florida Gators, and a late-game period against Wake Forest in which he scored 10 consecutive points, leading Florida State to a win. On February 7, 2007, Douglas injured the fourth metacarpal in his right (shooting) hand, forcing him to sit out six games (nearly a month)—of which Florida State lost five. In his first game (against the University of Miami) after sustaining his injury, Douglas scored 13 points, including a three-pointer that tied the game and forced overtime; Florida State went on to win the game. Douglas finished the season with averages of 12.7 points, 2.9 assists and 2.7 rebounds per game. In three games of the 2007 National Invitation Tournament (NIT), he averaged 11.7 points and 3.7 rebounds, as Florida State won twice before losing to Mississippi State University in the semifinals.

Junior year

In his junior season, Douglas continued his transition to point guard, creating offensive opportunities for others on the team in addition to scoring by himself. Although Douglas still needed to work on polishing the distribution aspect of his game, coach Hamilton said in January 2008 that "he's done an exceptional job when you take into consideration this hasn't been his role prior to coming to Florida State." Douglas' defense improved considerably; he accumulated 2.6 steals per game as a junior (compared to 1.2 steals in the previous season), the highest rate in the ACC. His total of 48 steals in 16 games against ACC teams is the third-highest in league history. In a game against the University of Virginia, Douglas' steal in the final minute (his sixth of the game) and subsequent free throws carried Florida State to a win that helped their chances of being selected to the 2008 NCAA tournament.

After the regular season concluded, Douglas was selected into the ACC All-Defensive Team and the All-ACC Third Team. Despite Douglas' efforts (18 points, 5 assists and 3 steals) against North Carolina in the quarterfinals, Florida State lost the game, effectively shutting them out from the NCAA tournament. After Florida State lost in the first round of the 2008 NIT, Douglas finished the season with 90 steals, second only to Sam Cassell in the number of steals made in one season (97). He led the team in scoring (15.4 ppg), steals (2.6 spg; also highest in the ACC) and assists (2.6).

Senior year
The 2008–09 Florida State team was composed of mostly freshman and sophomores, which meant that the veteran Douglas, now a senior (one of three on the team), featured more prominently in the offense than in previous years. He started all 35 games of the season, one of two Seminole players to do so. Douglas became the primary threat on offense, and was the sole top scorer for the team in 23 games. His scoring average increased by more than six points, to 21.5 points per game, which was the highest average on the team and in the ACC; he also averaged 2.9 assists, a team and career high, and 3.9 rebounds. He earned ACC All-Defensive Team honors again and was selected to the All-ACC First Team. His other major honors included being named the ACC Defensive Player of the Year, receiving the second-most votes for ACC Player of the Year and his selection to the Associated Press' All-America Third Team. Douglas' strong play in the ACC tournament, in which the Seminoles upset top-ranked North Carolina and advanced to their first ACC final, led to his selection to the ACC All-Tournament team, another first for a Florida State player. The Seminoles made their first appearance in the NCAA tournament in 11 years, playing against the University of Wisconsin. Douglas played well, scoring 26 points, but he missed an important three-point attempt late in the game and had Trévon Hughes score the winning shot while defending him. Wisconsin won 61–59 in overtime, thus ending Douglas' collegiate career.

Professional career

New York Knicks (2009–2012)
In preparation for the 2009 NBA draft, Douglas worked out at the draft combine during May 28–29, and participated in pre-draft workouts with ten teams.

On June 25, 2009, Douglas was selected by the Los Angeles Lakers with the 29th overall pick in the 2009 NBA draft, making him the first Seminole guard to be drafted in the first round since Bob Sura (1995). Later that night, the New York Knicks acquired the rights to Douglas in exchange for a second-round draft pick in 2011 and $3 million in cash considerations. He signed with the Knicks on July 9, 2009 and averaged a team-high 7.0 assists per game during the NBA Summer League. During the 2009–10 season, Douglas was a reserve guard. He scored a career-high 30 points in a win against the Chicago Bulls on November 4, 2010. On March 17, 2011, Douglas tied a Knicks record with nine three-pointers in a home win against the Memphis Grizzlies.

Houston Rockets (2012–2013)

On July 11, 2012, Douglas was traded, along with Josh Harrellson, Jerome Jordan, two future second-round draft picks and cash considerations, to the Houston Rockets in exchange for Marcus Camby. His best game as a Rocket came on December 4, 2012 when he scored a season-high 22 points against the Los Angeles Lakers.

Sacramento Kings (2013)
On February 20, 2013, Douglas was traded, along with Cole Aldrich and Patrick Patterson, to the Sacramento Kings in exchange for Thomas Robinson, Francisco García and Tyler Honeycutt.

Golden State Warriors (2013–2014)
On July 18, 2013, Douglas signed with the Golden State Warriors. He made 24 appearances for the franchise, averaging 11 minutes per game in a limited bench role. Throughout his brief tenure, he struggled with his accuracy, shooting only 37.2% from the field.

Miami Heat (2014)
On January 15, 2014, Douglas was traded to the Miami Heat in a three-team deal involving the Warriors and the Boston Celtics. The Heat made their fourth straight appearance in the NBA Finals in 2014, but lost the series in five games to the San Antonio Spurs.

China (2014–2015)
On August 19, 2014, Douglas signed a one-year deal with the Jiangsu Dragons of the Chinese Basketball Association. On February 1, 2015, he terminated his contract with Jiangsu following the conclusion of the regular season. He appeared in 35 games while averaging 19.1 points, 4.8 rebounds, 3.3 assists and 2.1 steals per game.

New Orleans Pelicans (2015–2016)
On February 4, 2015, Douglas signed a 10-day contract with the New Orleans Pelicans. On February 18, 2015, he signed a second 10-day contract with the Pelicans. However, the next day, he was waived by the Pelicans. He returned to the Pelicans on March 24, signing with the team for the rest of the season. On July 31, he was waived again by the Pelicans.

On August 11, 2015, Douglas signed with the Indiana Pacers. However, he was waived by the Pacers on October 26 after appearing in five preseason games. Four days later, he re-signed with the Pelicans. On March 31, 2016, he recorded 20 points and a season-high 10 assists in a 101–95 win over the Denver Nuggets. On July 12, 2016, he was waived by the Pelicans.

Memphis Grizzlies (2016–2017)
On October 3, 2016, Douglas signed with the Cleveland Cavaliers. However, he was later waived by the Cavaliers on October 15 after appearing in five preseason games. On December 5, 2016, he signed with the Memphis Grizzlies to help the team deal with numerous injuries. Memphis had to use an NBA hardship exemption in order to sign him as he made their roster stand at 16, one over the allowed limited of 15. He appeared in six games for the Grizzlies before he was waived by the team on December 15. On January 30, 2017, he signed a 10-day contract with the Grizzlies. He went on to sign a second 10-day contract with the Grizzlies on February 9, and then a rest-of-season contract on February 23. On March 18, 2017, Douglas was again waived by the Grizzlies.

Turkey (2017–2019)

Anadolu Efes (2017–2018)
On December 29, 2017, Douglas signed with Turkish club Anadolu Efes for the rest of the 2017–18 season. Douglas helped Anadolu Efes to win the 2018 Turkish Cup.

Sakarya (2018)
On August 6, 2018, Douglas signed with Sakarya BB of the Turkish Basketbol Süper Ligi (BSL). In 15 games played for Sakarya, Douglas averaged 15.4 points, 4.6 rebounds, 6.6 assists and 2.3 steals per game.

Darüşşafaka (2018–2019)
On December 5, 2018, Douglas parted ways with Sakarya and signed with Darüşşafaka for the rest of the season.

Spain & Italy (2019–2021)
On November 26, 2019, Douglas signed with Movistar Estudiantes of the Spanish Liga ACB. On February 21, 2020, he and his team part ways.

On March 2, 2020, Douglas signed with Varese of the Italian Lega Basket Serie A. In that period the Italian team was looking to replace Jason Clark who quit before the end of the season. In 26 games during the 2020–2021 season, Douglas averaged 14.7 points, 4.3 rebounds, 4.9 assists, and 1.2 steals per contest.

Greece (2021–2022)
On August 21, 2021, Douglas signed with Greek club Iraklis Thessaloniki. In 18 league, cup, and European competition matches, he averaged 16 points, 5.5 rebounds, 4.5 assists, and 2 steals, playing 32 minutes per contest.

Israel (2022)
On January 22, 2022, Douglas signed with Israeli club Hapoel Eilat for the rest of the season.

Benfica (2022–present)
On August 14, 2022, he has signed with Benfica of the Liga Portuguesa de Basquetebol.

Career statistics

NBA

Regular season

|-
| align="left" | 
| align="left" | New York
| 56 || 12 || 19.4 || .458 || .389 || .809 || 1.9 || 2.0 || .8 || .1 || 8.6
|-
| align="left" | 
| align="left" | New York
| 81 || 9 || 24.3 || .416 || .373 || .794 || 3.0 || 3.0 || 1.1 || .0 || 10.6
|-
| align="left" | 
| align="left" | New York
| 38 || 9 || 17.3 || .324 || .231 || .846 || 1.9 || 2.0 || .8 || .0 || 6.2
|-
| align="left" | 
| align="left" | Houston
| 49 || 0 || 18.6 || .395 || .377 || .882 || 1.8 || 1.9 || .8 || .0 || 8.1
|-
| align="left" | 
| align="left" | Sacramento
| 22 || 0 || 17.1 || .430 || .389 || 1.000 || 2.2 || 2.6 || 1.4 || .0 || 6.1
|-
| align="left" | 
| align="left" | Golden State
| 24 || 0 || 11.0 || .372 || .322 || .625 || 1.0 || .8 || .3 || .1 || 3.7
|-
| align="left" | 
| align="left" | Miami
| 27 || 17 || 15.2 || .394 || .279 || .769 || 2.3 || 1.8 || .5 || .1 || 4.2
|-
| align="left" | 
| align="left" | New Orleans
| 12 || 0 || 14.8 || .373 || .278 || .615 || 1.8 || 2.0 || .9 || .3 || 4.3
|-
| align="left" | 
| align="left" | New Orleans
| 61 || 18 || 20.7 || .411 || .399 || .848 || 2.3 || 2.6 || 1.1 || .1 || 8.7
|-
| align="left" | 
| align="left" | Memphis
| 24 || 0 || 16.4 || .368 || .167 || .828 || 2.5 || 2.3 || .7 || .2 || 4.8
|- class="sortbottom"
| align="center" colspan="2"| Career
| 394 || 65 || 19.1 || .404 || .354 || .824 || 2.2 || 2.2 || .8 || .1 || 7.6

Playoffs

|-
| style="text-align:left;"| 2011
| style="text-align:left;"| New York
| 4 || 3 || 28.0 || .366 || .389 || 1.000 || 3.3 || 2.3 || .5 || .0 || 10.8
|-
| style="text-align:left;"| 2012
| style="text-align:left;"| New York
| 1 || 0 || 8.0 || 1.000 || .000 || .000 || .0 || 1.0 || .0 || .0 || 2.0
|-
| align="left" | 2014
| align="left" | Miami
| 10 || 0 || 2.9 || .333 || .500 || .500 || .4 || .5 || .0 || .0 || 1.0
|- class="sortbottom"
| align="center" colspan="2"| Career 
| 15 || 3 || 9.9 || .373 || .417 || .875 || 1.1 || 1.0 || .1 || .0 || 3.7

EuroLeague

|-
| style="text-align:left;"| 2017–18
| style="text-align:left;"| Anadolu Efes
| 14 || 6 || 18.0 || .419 || .417 || .852 || 2.0 || 2.0 || .6 || .0 || 7.8 || 6.6
|-
|- class="sortbottom"
| style="text-align:center;" colspan="2"| Career
| 14 || 6 || 18.0 || .419 || .417 || .852 || 2.0 || 2.0 || .6 || .0 || 7.8 || 6.6

Personal life
Douglas' brother, Harry, is a former wide receiver that played with Atlanta Falcons and Tennessee Titans of the National Football League (NFL). In 2009, the Douglases became only the sixth set of brothers to play in the NBA and NFL.

See also

 2009 NCAA Men's Basketball All-Americans

References

External links
 RealGM profile

1986 births
Living people
20th-century African-American people
21st-century African-American sportspeople
African-American basketball players
All-American college men's basketball players
American expatriate basketball people in China
American expatriate basketball people in Greece
American expatriate basketball people in Italy
American expatriate basketball people in Turkey
American men's basketball players
Anadolu Efes S.K. players
Auburn Tigers men's basketball players
Basketball players from Georgia (U.S. state)
CB Estudiantes players
Darüşşafaka Basketbol players
Florida State Seminoles men's basketball players
Golden State Warriors players
Houston Rockets players
Iraklis Thessaloniki B.C. players
Jiangsu Dragons players
Lega Basket Serie A players
Liga ACB players
Los Angeles Lakers draft picks
Memphis Grizzlies players
Miami Heat players
New Orleans Pelicans players
New York Knicks players
Pallacanestro Varese players
Parade High School All-Americans (boys' basketball)
People from Jonesboro, Georgia
Point guards
S.L. Benfica basketball players
Sacramento Kings players
Sakarya BB players
Shooting guards
Sportspeople from the Atlanta metropolitan area